KUCP may refer to:

 KUCP-LP, a low-power radio station (100.3 FM) licensed to serve Kent, Washington, United States
 New Castle Municipal Airport (ICAO code KUCP)